Bartlesville is a city mostly in Washington County in the U.S. state of Oklahoma. The population was 37,290 at the 2020 census. It is the county seat of Washington County. The Caney River runs through Bartlesville.

Bartlesville is the primary city of the Bartlesville Micropolitan area, which consists of Washington County and had a population of 51,843 in 2018. A small portion of the city is in Osage County. The city is also part of the Tulsa Combined Statistical Area, with a population of 1,151,172 in 2015.

Bartlesville is notable as the longtime home of Phillips Petroleum Company. Frank Phillips founded Phillips Petroleum in Bartlesville in 1905 when the area was still an Indian Territory. The company merged with Conoco as ConocoPhillips and later split into the two independent companies, Phillips 66 and ConocoPhillips. Both companies have retained some operations in Bartlesville, but they have moved their corporate headquarters to Houston.

It is one of two places in Oklahoma where a Lenape Native American tribe lives, the other being Anadarko.

History
Jacob Bartles, son-in-law of Delaware chief Charles Journeycake, moved from Wyandotte County, Kansas, to Indian Territory in 1873. He settled first at Silver Lake, a natural lake south of the present city of Bartlesville. In 1874, he opened a trading post and post office on Turkey Creek, in what is now East Bartlesville. In the following year, he bought a grist mill on the Caney River and modified it to produce flour. Bartles then built a two-story general store and residence, and added a rooming house, a blacksmith shop and a livery stable. Other settlers soon moved into the immediate area, which was then called Bartles Town. In 1880, Bartles moved his Turkey Creek post office to this town. Bartles then provided the community with electricity, a telephone system and a water distribution system.

Development of the present city began after William Johnstone and George B. Keeler opened a general store on the south side of the Caney River in 1884. The first newspaper, The Weekly Magnet, began publication in March 1895. The town was incorporated in Indian Territory in January 1897. The town was surveyed and platted in 1898, and eighty acres were offered to the Atchison, Topeka and Santa Fe Railroad for a depot. The railroad reached the town in 1899. The post office was moved from "North Bartlesville" in 1899. Bypassed by the railroad, Jacob Bartles moved his store to Dewey, Oklahoma.

Bartlesville was also home to Frank Phillips (November 28, 1873 – August 23, 1950) who along with his brother, Lee Eldas "L.E." Phillips Sr founded Phillips Petroleum in Bartlesville in 1917 and made Bartlesville the headquarters of Phillips 66. The new company began with assets of $3 million, 27 employees and leases throughout Oklahoma and Kansas but grew to become a multi-billion dollar oil company. Although Bartlesville is no longer the headquarters, the company still has many employees in the community. In 2002, Phillips Petroleum merged with Conoco Oil Company and became ConocoPhillips.

Bartlesville was originally a sundown town where African Americans were not allowed to live. By 1907, the restriction had been lifted, and newspapers noted the town's first natural death of an African American, a man named Robert McGee.

In 1957, Bartlesville was the test site for the first experiment in pay cable television. The Bartlesville Telemovie System debuted with the film The Pajama Game, starring Doris Day, and aired it to an audience of 300 homes. The headline of the September 4, 1957, issue of Variety read, "First-Run Films Now at Home".

Geography

The Caney River flows through Bartlesville, separating the downtown area from the east side. The river flooded in October 1986 as a result of unusually heavy rainfall. The city was split in half for several days, and the flood caused considerable property damage. The river broke its banks again in June 2007, cresting five feet below the 1986 level. The Pathfinder Parkway, a paved trail for walking, running, and cycling, runs alongside the Caney River.

Climate
However, even with this record of extremes, the climate of Bartlesville is considered humid subtropical (Köppen Cfa) with cool winters and hot summers, with the majority of precipitation falling in spring, between the months of April and June. Bartlesville lies in Tornado Alley, meaning that severe weather, including tornadoes, can occur. Severe weather occurs most often in the spring months, and occurs with much less frequency throughout the rest of the year.

Demographics

As of the census of 2000, there were 34,748 people, 14,565 households, and 9,831 families residing in the city. The population density was 1,646.4 people per square mile (635.5/km). There were 16,091 housing units at an average density of 762.4 per square mile (294.3/km). The racial makeup of the city was 82.09% White, 3.20% African American, 7.18% Native American, 0.96% Asian, 0.02% Pacific Islander, 1.02% from other races, and 5.54% from two or more races. Hispanic or Latino people of any race were 3.02% of the population.

There were 14,565 households, out of which 30.1% had children under the age of 18 living with them, 54.9% were married couples living together, 9.7% had a female householder with no husband present, and 32.5% were non-families. 29.5% of all households were made up of individuals, and 14.0% had someone living alone who was 65 years of age or older. The average household size was 2.35 and the average family size was 2.89.

In the city, the population was spread out, with 24.9% under the age of 18, 8.1% from 18 to 24, 24.8% from 25 to 44, 23.7% from 45 to 64, and 18.5% who were 65 years of age or older. The median age was 40 years. For every 100 females, there were 90.3 males. For every 100 females age 18 and over, there were 85.1 males.

The median income for a household in the city was $47,195, and the median income for a family was $56,432. The per capita income for the city was $27,417. About 17.3% of the population were below the poverty line.

As of 2010 Bartlesville had a population of 35,750. The racial and ethnic composition of the population was 79.0% White (76.1% non-Hispanic), 3.1% Black or African American, 8.7% Native American, 1.4% Asian (0.4% Indian, 0.3% Chinese, 0.2% Vietnamese), 2.1% reporting some other race, 5.7% reporting two or more races and 5.9% Hispanic or Latino (4.5% Mexican, 0.3% Spanish or Spaniard, 0.2% Puerto Rican).

Economy
Oklahoma's first commercial oil well, the Nellie Johnstone, discovered oil on 15 April 1897 along a bank of the Caney River, near Bartlesville.

Before its merger with Conoco, Phillips Petroleum Company had its headquarters in Bartlesville. After ConocoPhillips formed, the combined company established a global systems and services office in Bartlesville. ConocoPhillips spun most of its operations not related to exploration and production to form a new company, Phillips 66, in 2012. The two companies combined employ or contract with more than 3,800 people in the area. Chevron Phillips also has an office here.

Phillips Petroleum had a large presence in Bartlesville. A writer for the Tacoma (Wash.) News Tribune said, "I never quite understood why the town where I spent my high school years wasn't named Phillipsburg. Nearly everything else in town was named after the Phillips Petroleum company or its founder".

Tourism 

Price Tower, designed by Frank Lloyd Wright, stands in downtown Bartlesville. It is Wright's only realized skyscraper, and one of only two vertically oriented Wright structures extant (the other is the S.C. Johnson Wax Research Tower in Racine, Wisconsin). 

The nearby Bartlesville Community Center, designed by William Wesley Peters, one of Wright's students, hosts OKM Music, an annual week-long music event in June. Begun in 1985 as the "OK Mozart" International Festival, and organized around the music of Wolfgang Amadeus Mozart, the festival featured performances of classical music, jazz, light opera, and more. World-renowned musicians who have performed at OK Mozart include Itzhak Perlman, Joyce Yang, Joshua Bell, and André Watts. Around 2018 the festival renamed itself OKM Music to signify that it was broadening its range beyond the predominantly classical music it had featured for much of its 33-year history. The Community Center also hosts the concerts presented by the Bartlesville Community Concert Association.

The city also hosts several annual festivals and shows, nearly all focused in the downtown. Sunfest is the first weekend of June. It includes an arts and crafts show, a music festival, a kids festival, and a classic cars show. A second classic air show and festival is held in the fall. An Oklahoma Indian Summer Festival is held at the Community Center downtown each fall.

Bartlesville's downtown revitalization efforts are in full swing, with many blocks of the National Register Historic District, and the catalyst project, the once burned out May Brothers and 1904 Buildings, coming to completion at the downtown's center. The original Kress Building has been taken over by Bartlesville Monthly Magazine and restored with the Frank Phillips Club on the first floor. The original Jane Phillips Memorial Hospital is about to undergo historic preservation for reuse as lofts, as downtown is so full of young professionals that the many developed historic lofts all have a long waiting list, and nearly 20 new retail and restaurant businesses have recently opened downtown, including Indian Coffee, Lubella's Boutique, and Hideaway Pizza. Downtown Bartlesville Inc., the Bartlesville Redevelopment Trust Authority, the Bartlesville Convention & Visitors Bureau and the Bartlesville Development Authority work in tandem to promote this thriving "Next City".

Frank Phillips's former home is a museum maintained by the Oklahoma Historical Society. It holds one of the most complete private collections of Colt firearms in the world. The property includes the Phillips family's lodge and mausoleum, along with a huge wildlife preserve with herds of American bison, elk, Texas longhorn cattle, water buffalo, zebra, and more than 20 other animal species.

The Phillips Petroleum Company Museum shows the early days of petroleum production in Oklahoma and the evolution of Phillips Petroleum in that industry. Admission is free.

A Wall of Honor is inside Washington Park Mall, with names of service members listed on panels beside cabinets that display military artifacts, photos, story boards, POW/MIA listings, and other exhibits. A special display honors Lance Corporal Thomas A. Blair, Oklahoma's first casualty during the Iraq War.

Bruce Goff designed Shin'enKan ("The House of the Far Away Heart") in 1956. Built for Joe D. Price as his house and studio, it was destroyed by fire in December 1996. Bartlesville is the home of multiple other Goff buildings, a home for the Price Pipe and Supply Family by Frank Lloyd Wright, and numerous homes by the Kansas City architect Edward Buehler Delk, most notably LaQuinta. The Conference Basketball tournament for The Great American Conference is hosted in Bartlesville.

Education
Oklahoma Wesleyan University, a private religious school affiliated with the Wesleyan Church, enrolls about 1,100 students at the main campus in Bartlesville, satellite locations, and online campuses. About 700 students attend the Rogers State University branch campus downtown.

Career and technical training is provided by Tri County Technology Center, which offers several programs for high-school and adult students along with short-term courses. In December 2018, Tri-County Tech was recognized for performance excellence as one of the recipients of the Malcolm Baldrige National Quality Award.

Bartlesville Public Schools are in the Bartlesville Public School District (BPSD), also known as Independent School District 30. They include six elementary (PreK-5) sites, Central and Madison middle schools (6-8), and the high school (9-12).

Private schools in Bartlesville include St. John School, a Catholic school, Coram Deo Classical Academy, and the Wesleyan Christian School, which is affiliated with First Wesleyan Church and Paths to Independence, a school for children and adults with autism. Some students also attend Tulsa-area private high schools.

Infrastructure

Transportation
Bartlesville is served by two US Highways and one Oklahoma state highway: 

US-75 is the primary north-south US highway through Bartlesville and Washington County.
US-60 is the primary east-west US highway in Bartlesville and Washington County.
SH-123.

Intercity bus service is available through Jefferson Lines.

Airport and aviation
Bartlesville Municipal Airport sits on the city's west side on US-60 in Osage County. It is a single-runway airport. Runway 17/35 is a concrete runway that is 6,850' by 100'. It has terminal and fixed-base operations and is owned by the City of Bartlesville.

In the early 1950s, the airport hosted commercial air transportation provided by Central Airlines. Commercial air transportation is now available at Tulsa International Airport, about 45 miles south.

Railroad
Bartlesville is served by the South Kansas & Oklahoma Railroad, a shortline carrier of Watco.

Notable people

 Boots Adams, business executive and civic philanthropist of Bartlesville, Oklahoma
 Bud Adams, owner of the Tennessee Titans; enrolled Cherokee, grew up in Bartlesville
 Nancy Barrett, actress
 Omar Browning, basketball player, 1948 United States men's Olympic basketball team head coach
 Mark Costello, Oklahoma politician
 Leo G. Cox, theologian
 Patrick Cranshaw, actor
 Ree Drummond, blogger and TV cook
 Lyle Goodhue, scientist 
 Meredith Howard Harless, performer
 Becky Hobbs, singer
 Sven Erik Holmes, United States district judge
 Ted Hsu, retired Member of Canadian Parliament for the riding of Kingston and the Islands
 Todd Ames Hunter, Texas politician, born in Bartlesville in 1953
 Bob Kurland, basketball player
Terrence Malick, cinema director
 Tyson Meade, rock singer
 Emeka Okafor, basketball player
 Frank Phillips, founder of Phillips Petroleum
 Kinga Philipps, actress/producer
 Mark Price, basketball player
 Tim Pugh, baseball player
 John Wesley Raley, minister and educator
 Allen Rucker, writer
 William Salyers, stage, screen and voice actor
 Terry Saul, Choctaw/Chickasaw artist and educator
 Louis Skurcenski, basketball player
 Gretchen Wyler, actress
 Kathleen Zellner, attorney

In popular culture

The Bartlesville Barflies Barbershop Quartet were the inaugural champions of SPEBSQSA.

The city served as the setting for much of Terrence Malick's 2012 film To the Wonder.

See also

 Bartlesville Boosters, a minor league baseball team of the early 20th century
 Jo Allyn Lowe Park
 National Register of Historic Places listings in Washington County, Oklahoma
 Pathfinder Parkway, a bicycle and jogging path which runs throughout Bartlesville
 Voice of the Martyrs headquarters
 Washington Park Mall

References

External links

 City of Bartlesville
 Bartlesville Chamber of Commerce
 Bartlesville news and community events
 History of Bartlesville & Washington County
 Bartlesville Area History Museum: Bartlesville Timeline (illustrated)
 Encyclopedia of Oklahoma History and Culture - Bartlesville

 
Cities in Oklahoma
Cities in Osage County, Oklahoma
Cities in Washington County, Oklahoma
County seats in Oklahoma
Tulsa metropolitan area
Micropolitan areas of Oklahoma
Populated places established in 1884
Sundown towns in Oklahoma
Organic architecture
Frank Lloyd Wright
1884 establishments in Indian Territory